Manjalloor  is a village in Ernakulam district in the Indian state of Kerala.

Manjalloor is a rural village, 3 km from Vazhakulam. It belongs to Manjallor gramapanchayat, Muvattupuzha taluk, Ernakulam district, Kerala. SH-8 highway pass near the village and can be reached via Vengachuvadu from SH-8. The Manjalloor Bhagavati Sastha temple is located in the heart of the village.
 India census, Manjalloor had a population of 16044 with 7995 males and 8049 females.

References

Villages in Ernakulam district